Sports Hub may refer to:
Fico Sports Hub, a defunct futsal venue in Singapore
Greenfield International Stadium in Kerala, India, commonly known as The Sports Hub
Singapore Sports Hub
WBZ-FM, known as "98.5 The Sports Hub"